USRC Forward  was a revenue cutter constructed for the U.S. Revenue Cutter Service in 1882 by Pusey & Jones shipyard in Wilmington, Delaware.  She was the second Revenue Cutter Service vessel named Forward and was named for Walter Forward, the fifteenth United States Secretary of the Treasury. The iron-hulled vessel originally cost 72,750 and was powered by a two-cylinder steam engine with a topsail schooner brigantine sail pattern. Although Forward was considered a model ship at the time of its construction, it was severely underpowered and had unreliable machinery. The cost of repairs in the first fifteen years of operation was 52,000.

History
Her homeport from her commissioning on 1 November 1882 to 1904 was Mobile, Alabama where she patrolled the Gulf of Mexico enforcing customs laws and assisting mariners in distress. During this period she was temporarily assigned to several other areas along the Atlantic coast and the Gulf of Mexico. After undergoing repairs in Baltimore, Maryland from 1888 to 1890 her homeport was at Key West, Florida and she gained the mission of preventing smuggling of men, guns and ammunition into Cuba. In 1895 Secretary of the Treasury John G. Carlisle assigned Forward and seven other cutters to enforce United States neutrality in Cuba's revolt against Spain. The cutters were responsible for patrolling the Florida Strait and prevent attempts to smuggle arms into Cuba from the United States. On 5 December 1895, Forward and  discovered a recently abandoned camp at Middle Cape Sable, Florida that had enough army and medical supplies to indicate that about fifty men had been training there. In 1898, Charleston, South Carolina was homeport until she returned to Key West in 1904. On 2 June 1905 she was assigned to convoy Marine Hospital Service barge Senator from Havana, Cuba to Key West, Florida. On 14 November 1905 Forward was placed out of commission at the Revenue Service Yard at Baltimore for repairs and the crew was transferred to other cutters. The crew of  reported aboard Forward on 7 August 1907 and she was recommissioned 17 August. On 12 October 1907 Forward received orders to report to Chesapeake Bay for joint drills and inspections with other cutters of the service. In September 1908, Forward was ordered to report to the Collector of Customs at Tampa, Florida to investigate sponge smuggling. In 1909, she was tasked with towing Marine Hospital Service Steamer McAdam from Knights Bay to Key West and Marine Hospital Service barge Senator from Key West to Knights Bay. She searched for the missing schooner Albert B. Mills and assisted her before reporting to Mobile. On 20 June 1910 Forward was ordered to "enforce law among sponge fishermen" near Tampa, Florida On 19 October 1910 she was involved in the search for the overdue tug Jones off the Florida coast. Forward was sold on 24 October to Boston Iron and Metal Co. for 4,151.

Notes
Footnotes

Citations

References used

 
 
 
 
 

Ships of the United States Revenue Cutter Service
Ships built by Pusey and Jones
1882 ships